Helsinki City Transport or HKL (Finnish: Helsingin kaupungin liikennelaitos, Swedish: Helsingfors stads trafikverk, abbreviated to HST) is the official city-owned public transport company in Helsinki, Finland. It operates the Helsinki Metro. HKL's bus operations were merged with another city-owned company, Suomen Turistiauto, to form a new bus company called Helsingin Bussiliikenne, which has since been acquired by Koiviston Auto. Until the founding of HSL in January 2010, HKL was responsible for the planning and organization of all public transport in Helsinki.

See also
 Public transport in Helsinki
 Helsinki metro
 Helsinki tram
 Helsinki City Bikes

References

External links
 Official HKL site
 Journey Planner for Helsinki region

Public transport operators
Transport in Helsinki
Transport in Finland